Diebuster, also known as  and Gunbuster 2, is a six-episode original video animation series directed by Kazuya Tsurumaki, written by Yōji Enokido and animated by Gainax. It was created to commemorate the studio's 20th anniversary in 2004, and it is a sequel to their 1988 OVA Gunbuster.

A compilation film, titled , that condenses Gunbuster and Diebuster into two feature-length films, was released on October 1, 2006.

It was licensed for American release by Bandai Visual USA as Gunbuster 2. Discotek Media has since re-licensed Diebuster as Gunbuster 2: Diebuster and it was released on May 21, 2013. A manga adaptation of the series is available in Japan.

Story
Top o Nerae 2! Diebuster follows the story of Nono, a country girl who dreams of becoming a space pilot (or, to be more precise, "like Nonoriri", the meaning of which is revealed as the series progresses) who, due to a chance encounter with an actual space pilot, finds herself becoming part of the elite Fraternity. Made up of teenage pilots called Topless, and armed with quasi-humanoid weapons called Buster Machines, the Fraternity's mission is to protect the people of the Solar System from attack by swarms of space monsters.

The series revolves around Nono's quest to become like Nonoriri, her relationship with Lal'C Mellk Mal, the first Topless she meets whom she immediately idolizes (to the point of calling her onee-sama, or big sister), and the hard work she believes she has to do to be "worthy" of Lal'C's attention. It also explores her interactions with the rest of the Idols, her efforts to fit in and, ultimately, the truth to her forgotten past.

After dealing with swarms of space monsters, and the personal conflicts of the Topless themselves, the empire discovers a threat of a real space monster when the Serpentine Sisters attempt to awaken something they call "an eternal Topless", which could destroy the space monsters for them and provide them with a way to keep from ever losing their Topless power. This so-called "Topless" is actually a true space monster, as Lal'C learns when she witnesses its vicious attacks against her comrades and, horrified, asks Dix-Neuf (her Buster Machine) what this creature might be. The fact that the monsters Topless had been battling up to this point were merely first-generation alternate Buster Machines, used to protect the human race from true space monsters in earlier generations as a Solar Defense Force, is also revealed.

During these events, Nono's potent powers as Buster Machine no. 7 awaken, she and the Topless do battle with the real space monster and are victorious. Nearing the end of the story, they encounter the last of the space monsters carrying a black hole and utilizing it as an energy source to warp from system to system. The empire plans to use Nono's Buster Machine powers and the artificial Buster Machines to destroy the final Space Monster. However, Lal'C and the Fraternity find themselves useless during this time, and one of the Topless is permanently put out of commission when he has finally reached his age. Nono attempts to hold back the monster, but to no avail. Lal'C then brings Jupiter 2 out of orbit and seems to summon it the way she summons Dix-Neuf, causing it to crash directly into the monster - which shows no signs of damage.

The Space Monster warps closer to earth, and Nono suddenly departs with the Solar Defence Force, seemingly vanishing from the system. The empire decides to use Earth as a weapon to destroy the final Space Monster to ensure their survival. Meanwhile, Lal'C, for the first time, delves into Nono's past; how she learned to idolize "Nonoriri" and the man who found her in the depths of Space. She and the remainder of the Topless prepare for the Space Monster's arrival and the timely intervention of Nono, who now becomes the mega android DieBuster. However, frustrated with Nono's departure, Lal'C batters "DieBuster" in a fit of rage. Just as she is about to land a finishing blow using Douze-Mille's reformed components as a Buster Machine, her Topless powers suddenly expire. "DieBuster" attempts to attack the Space Monster, with no effect. However, the monster vaporizes "DieBuster's" hands. Dix-Neuf moves on his own to help Lal'C access the true cockpit in his brain, activating his true form, and coaxes Nono to come out of the disintegrating "DieBuster" and fight with her. With the two girls together once more, and Dix-Neuf's new powers, they defeat the final Space Monster with a Double Inazuma Kick.

However, in the wake of their battle, the Black hole tears open due to the Space Monster's death. Nono and Lal'C share one last moment together, their hopes, dreams and futures if they had survived, and Nono finally gives Lal'C a piece of her generator, or singularity, in the form of an origami crane, before using the remnants of the Alternate Buster Machines that comprised "DieBuster" to warp the black hole and herself away from earth. Dix-Neuf saves Lal'C, and brings her back to civilization, where she weeps at the loss of Nono.

Ten years later, Lal'C becomes an environmentalist and her Topless comrades have moved on from their previous life. She stays on a hilltop in the Okinawan coast line, musing about Nono before the city's lights shut off. She stares in the starry sky, and it is revealed all along that Nono and Lal'C's timeline is the setting of the last episode of the first Gunbuster OVA, as explicitly said by Lal'C when she first muses about Nono. Its two pilots, Noriko and Kazumi, descend from the remnants of the first ever Buster Machine, and Lal'C vows to tell Noriko about Nono's life and her sacrifice.

Characters
 
 
 Hailing from a rural community in the Martian countryside, Nono is a simple and clumsy girl with a big dream: she wants to be a space pilot. And not just any space pilot, but one to rival "Nonoriri". Of course, dreaming of being a pilot and actually becoming one are two entirely different things, as she soon finds out upon reaching the city. Even after landing a somewhat dead-end job as a waitress in one of the city's bars, Nono stubbornly holds on to her ideals, despite the chiding of her boss and the bar's regular patrons. However, her persistence pays off when she encounters a real space pilot in the person of Lal'C Mellk Mal, member of the elite Fraternity and current pilot of Buster Machine Dix-Neuf. It is through Lal'C (whom she impulsively dubs her onee-sama, or big sister) that Nono finally finds the means to make her dreams a reality.
 Possessing a bubbly personality and a near-endless supply of optimism, Nono seems to be a normal, if clumsy, country girl. However, Nono is anything but normal; in fact, she is not even human, but an android, who cannot quite remember the reason why she was built (though much of her past is revealed later in the series). She idolizes Lal'C, despite the fact that the latter seems to regard her with mild annoyance, and will do anything to please her.
 Nono has trace recorded history of Takaya Noriko and Amano Kazumi (The pilots of Buster Machines 1 and 2) in her memory. The very person she Idolizes and wants to become is Takaya Noriko. Due to her damaged memory, Nono cannot remember Noriko's actual name and thus pronounces it Nonoriri. Nono's memory of Amano Kazumi is referenced when she calls Lal'C Onee-sama and when Nono makes origami cranes. The final reference to Top o Nerae! from Nono's memory is the catch phrase that she has memorized, "With guts, and effort," spoken in Japanese. Nono sacrifices her life in the last episode by using her generator and the remaining artificial Buster machines to seemingly warp a fatal black hole left in the wake of her climactic battle with Lal'C and the final Space Monster, leaving her legacy in a form of a badly done origami crane.
 Lal'C Mellk Mal
 
 The current holder of the top kill score among Topless pilots, Lal'C, along with fellow pilots Nicola and Tycho, is part of the so-called 'Idol' group (pilots with exceptionally high kill rates). She is also the current pilot of Buster Machine Dix-Neuf, the oldest buster machine still in operation. Nicknamed 'princess' by her teammates, Lal'C is outwardly cool and self-confident—traits that draw Nono's admiration for her, much to her initial annoyance. It is Lal'C who helps induct Nono (with some indirect assistance from Nicola) into the Fraternity as an 'auxiliary member', despite the fact that Nono manifests none of the traits associated with being a Topless.
 While initially bothered by Nono's hero-worship of her, Lal'C quickly gets used to her company, to the point where she can talk about things she would not normally tell anyone. She senses some potential in Nono, and admires the girl's never-give-up attitude a little (though she might act otherwise), but doubts if guts and perseverance alone can make the girl's dreams come true.
 In the epilogue, she is one of the many inhabitants of earth to welcome Noriko Takaya and Kazumi Amano and presumably passes Nono's legacy and gift to Noriko.
 
 
 The only male Topless on the 'Idol' team, Nicola is the pilot of Buster Machine Vingt-Sept and, before Lal'C's inclusion into the ranks of the Topless, was considered one of the most powerful Topless of his generation. He is Lal'C's inspiration (in as much as Lal'C is Nono's inspiration), and seems to have a relationship with her, though it is debatable whether it is of a romantic nature or not. He is interested in Nono and sees potential in her to be a Buster Machine pilot, despite the fact that Nono has never manifested any kind of Topless reaction (something that, according to their minder Casio, may not be possible in artificial beings), and secretly helps Nono join the Fraternity under the premise of being an 'auxiliary' member.
 Considered 'old' among the current Topless (as he is nearing late adolescence), Nicola is already having a hard time manifesting the Exotic Maneuvers needed to power his machine. As such, he seems to secretly be seeking a way to extend his 'tenure' as a Topless, to the point of joining the Serpentine Twin's inner circle and acting as their watcher over Nono's activities.
 He ultimately loses his ability to pilot the Buster machine and attempts to sexually assault Nono under the belief that she is close enough to a Buster Machine. He soon becomes a lieutenant in the empire. His fate in the final episode is unknown.
 Tycho Science
 
 The final member of the 'Idol' team, Tycho is brash, impulsive, and utterly determined (at least in the beginning) to best Lal'C's longstanding kill record, seeing it as a chance to wipe the normally smug look off the face of the teacher's pet (another of Lal'C's nicknames among the members of the Fraternity). She has a low opinion of Topless in general (despite the fact that she is a Topless herself) due to an event in her childhood where—in spite of her powers—she was unable to cure the illness of a close friend, and is annoyed by Nono's constant attempts to prove herself worthy to become a Buster Machine pilot. Ironically, it is Nono who later helps her change her way of thinking for the better. While it is not outwardly implied, the two become friends, though not on the same level as Nono and Lal'C.
 Initially Tycho pilots the Buster Machine No.66: Soixante-Six, but it is destroyed when (against her initial orders) she uses it to impulsively attack the Jupiter Express (a massive swarm of space monsters that roamed the space between Jupiter and Saturn). After a period of self-doubt, she is able to awaken Buster Machine Quatre-Vingt-Dix, and it remains her machine for the rest of the series.
 In the epilogue, Tycho becomes an emissary of Earth and travels to various systems with the corps. She was not present during the homecoming of Noriko and Kazumi.
 
 
 The only adult member of the 'Idol' team, Casio is their guardian, technician, and confidant rolled into one. A former Topless himself (he was a pilot of Dix-Neuf before Lal'C joined the Fraternity), Casio possesses an intimate understanding of the workings of the Buster Machines, as well as the people forced to pilot them. That is part of why he was one of the first to express his doubts on Nicola's assertion that Nono had the potential to become a pilot. However, despite his initial misgivings, he joins Lal'C in welcoming Nono into their 'team'.
 Despite being a lech and a joker, Casio can be surprisingly serious when the situation merits it. He secretly yearns to pilot a Buster Machine again, but is resigned to the fact that he can only be near them, due to his advanced age. He is aware of the shady activities of the Serpentine Twins, but not the exact details of their little 'project'. Casio's fate at the end of the series is unknown, but presumably remains an engineer in the empire.
 The Serpentine Sisters
 
 Two highly mysterious members of Topless, the Serpentine Sisters are the oldest living Topless. They plan to awaken something inside the moon Titan that will give them the secret to eternal Topless powers, and are revealed to actually consume its meat in order to prolong their powers until they can awaken the 'fluctuating gravity well', as they call it. Their true motivation for needing these powers is the fact that without them, they might lose their close connection.

Episode list

Music and theme songs
The music was composed and conducted by Kōhei Tanaka, the composer of Gunbuster.

Opening Theme
 "Groovin' Magic", by ROUND TABLE feat. Nino

Ending Theme
 "Hoshikuzu Namida" (Stardust Tears), by ACKO

Notes

References

External links
 Official Top o Nerae 2! website 
 Gainax Top o Nerae 2! website 
 Top o Nerae 2! & Top o Nerae! Gattai Gekijouban movie website 
 Top o Nerae 2! Webnovel 
 
 DIEBUSTER WEB RADIO TOP! LESS (onsen(音泉)2005.10.4- DJ: Mitsuo Iwata (Nichola), Yukari Fukui (Nono)) 
 Official Gunbuster 2 website

2006 anime films
2004 anime OVAs
2006 manga
Bandai Visual
Discotek Media
Fujimi Shobo manga
Gainax
Maiden Japan
Shōnen manga